Silli  Assembly constituency   is an assembly constituency in  the Indian state of Jharkhand.

Members of Assembly

See also
Vidhan Sabha
List of states of India by type of legislature
Jharkhand Legislative Assembly

References
Schedule – XIII of Constituencies Order, 2008 of Delimitation of Parliamentary and Assembly constituencies Order, 2008 of the Election Commission of India 

Assembly constituencies of Jharkhand